Brady Preston Gentry (March 25, 1896 – November 9, 1966) was a U.S. Representative from Texas.

Born in Colfax, Texas, Gentry attended the public schools and East Texas State College, Commerce, Texas. He graduated from Cumberland University, Lebanon, Tennessee, and studied law. He was admitted to the bar and began practice in Tyler, Texas. In 1918, Gentry enlisted in the United States Army; he served in Europe and rose to the rank of captain of Infantry. Gentry was the county attorney of Smith County 1921–1924 and the county judge of Smith County 1931–1939. He served as chairman of the Texas State Highway Commission 1939–1945.

Gentry was elected as a Democrat to the Eighty-third and Eighty-fourth Congresses (January 3, 1953 – January 3, 1957). He was not a candidate for renomination in 1956 to the Eighty-fifth Congress. After leaving Congress, Gentry resumed the practice of law.

He was one of the majority of the Texan delegation to decline to sign the 1956 Southern Manifesto opposing the desegregation of public schools ordered by the Supreme Court in Brown v. Board of Education.

He died in Houston, Texas, November 9, 1966. He was interred in Rose Hill Cemetery, Tyler, Texas.

Sources

 
 
 

1896 births
1966 deaths
County judges in Texas
County district attorneys in Texas
Cumberland University alumni
Texas A&M University–Commerce alumni
United States Army personnel of World War I
United States Army officers
Democratic Party members of the United States House of Representatives from Texas
People from Tyler, Texas
People from Van Zandt County, Texas
20th-century American politicians
Military personnel from Texas